Drewsey is an unincorporated community in Harney County, in the U.S. state of Oregon. It has the ZIP Code of 97904.

History
The region around Drewsey was frequented by Paiute tribes long before white settlers arrived. They caught salmon in the river and its tributaries and hunted and foraged on the land. Subsequent clashes between the two cultures led to creation of the Malheur Indian Reservation, which included the Drewsey area, in 1872. There the Paiutes and others were expected to learn about white culture and to become farmers. After further clashes, the Indians were re-located from the Malheur region to reservations elsewhere in the West. By the early 1880s, settlers began establishing themselves in and around Drewsey.

Abner Robbins opened a store here in 1883 and named the place "Gouge Eye" to commemorate a local dispute. When Robbins applied for a post office, postal authorities did not accept the original name, so he changed it to "Drusy". When the office was established in 1884, however, it was registered under the name "Drewsey".

Drewsey grew rapidly in the late 19th century, depending on farming and ranching for its economic base. The Pacific Livestock Company, two lumbers mills, and other businesses thrived here through the 1920s. However, bypassed by the nearest east−west railway as well as the main highway, Drewsey lost population during the Great Depression and after. In the 21st century, Drewsey consists of a small number of homes, a combined garage and store with a post office, a tavern and restaurant, two churches, and an elementary school.

Geography

Climate
Drewsey has a steppe climate (Köppen Csb).

Time zones
Although Drewsey is officially in the Pacific Time Zone, some residents choose to unofficially observe the Mountain Time Zone due to close proximity to Malheur County. Despite this, Pacific Time is strictly adhered to by businesses and the Oregon Department of Transportation

Education

Drewsey Elementary School is in Drewsey. It serves children in kindergarten through grade 8. Pine Creek Elementary School also has a Drewsy address. In 1969 Pine Creek Elementary had 8 students.

High school students are zoned to Crane Union High School, of Harney County Union High School District 1J.

Harney County is not in a community college district but has a "contract out of district" (COD) with Treasure Valley Community College. TVCC operates the Burns Outreach Center in Burns.

Infrastructure

Transportation
In the 21st century, Drewsey is a stop on the Eastern Public Oregon Intercity Transit (POINT) bus line between Bend and Ontario. It makes one stop per day in each direction.

Two roads for cars and trucks lead to the community. Drewsey Road links Drewsey to Route 20, to the south. Drewsey Market Road connects to rural locations to the west along the Malheur River.

References

External links
Historic images of Drewsey from Salem Public Library
Historic image of the Globe Saloon in Drewsey
Historic image of the Swede Saloon in Drewsey

Unincorporated communities in Harney County, Oregon
Populated places established in 1883
1884 establishments in Oregon
Populated places established in 1884
Unincorporated communities in Oregon